The Texas Iraqi Campaign Medal is the fourth highest campaign/service award that may be issued to a service member of the Texas Military Forces.

Eligibility 
The Texas Iraqi Campaign Medal shall be issued to any service member of the Texas Military Forces who:

 Was mobilized into service under command of the United States Armed Forces (Title 10)
 After 19 March 2003 in support of Operation Iraqi Freedom
 After 31 August 2010 in support of Operation New Dawn

Authority

Awarding 
Texas Government Code, Chapter 437 (Texas Military), Subchapter H. (Awards), Section 355 (Other Awards), Line 13.

Legal 
The Texas Iraqi Campaign Medal was established by Senator Kirk Watson in Senate Bill 356, authorized by the Eighty-second Texas Legislature, and approved by Governor Rick Perry on May 28, 2011, effective same date.

Description

Notable recipients

See also 
 Awards and decorations of the Texas Military
 Awards and decorations of the Texas government

 Texas Military Forces
 Texas Military Department
 List of conflicts involving the Texas Military

References 

Awards and decorations of the Texas Military Forces
Texas Military Forces
Texas Military Department